Enzo Di Santantonio (born 11 July 1995) is a French professional footballer who most recently played as a midfielder for Sporting Club Toulon. He also holds Italian citizenship.

Career
Di Santantonio made his Serie C debut for Mantova on 10 September 2014 in a game against Lumezzane.

References

External links
 

Living people
1995 births
Sportspeople from Toulon
French sportspeople of Italian descent
Association football midfielders
French footballers
CS Sedan Ardennes players
Genoa C.F.C. players
Mantova 1911 players
Brescia Calcio players
Santarcangelo Calcio players
FC Bastia-Borgo players
SC Toulon players
Serie B players
Serie C players
Championnat National players
French expatriate footballers
French expatriate sportspeople in Italy]
Expatriate footballers in Italy
Footballers from Provence-Alpes-Côte d'Azur